Stephen Danbusky (born April 18, 1977 in New Hyde Park, New York) is an American soccer player who currently plays for Hampton Roads Piranhas in the USL Premier Development League.

Career

College
Danbusky attended Williams College, where he played on the school's NCAA Division III soccer team from 1995 to 1998. Danbusky and his teammates were the NCAA Division III Soccer Champions in 1995, and in 1998 he was a first team All American.  He graduated in 1999 with a B.A. in psychology.

Professional
Danbusky signed with the Long Island Rough Riders of the USL A-League in 1999, and played with the team for the next three years. In 2001, he was called up to the New England Revolution, but did not enter a game.  In 2002, he moved to the Connecticut Wolves, where he was named the USL Second Division Defender of the Year. The Wolves folded at the end of the season and Danbusky moved to the Virginia Beach Mariners of the USL First Division.

After the Mariners folded at the end of the 2006 season Danbusky announced his retirement, but came back to sign with the Hampton Roads Piranhas in the USL Premier Development League in 2007.

Coaching
In 2002, Danbusky became an assistant coach with Western New England University. He had also served as a volunteer assistant coach with Adelphi University.

References

External links
 MLS: Stephen Danbusky

1977 births
Living people
American soccer coaches
American soccer players
Long Island Rough Riders players
Connecticut Wolves players
Virginia Beach Mariners players
Williams Ephs men's soccer players
Western New England Golden Bears men's soccer coaches
Virginia Beach Piranhas players
USL First Division players
Adelphi Panthers men's soccer coaches
USL League Two players
A-League (1995–2004) players
People from New Hyde Park, New York
Association football defenders